Bank of American Fork is a historic commercial building in downtown American Fork, Utah, United States, that is listed on the National Register of Historic Places (NRHP) and once again serves as the headquarters of the bank (Altabank) which was  formerly known as the Bank of American Fork.

Description
The building is located at 1 East Main Street (US-89) in downtown American Fork. It is significant as the only surviving bank building and the "most visually impressive" of four surviving intact historic commercial buildings on Main Street.

Originally called The People's State Bank of American Fork, it officially changed its name to Bank of American Fork in the 1960s. Bank of American Fork purchased and restored the historical building built in 1911 and was listed on the NRHP March 9, 1993. The historic building originally housed the original Bank of American Fork that closed after the 1929 stock market crash. In 2019, the Bank of American Fork was rebranded as Altabank.

See also

 National Register of Historic Places listings in Utah County, Utah

References

External links

Bank buildings on the National Register of Historic Places in Utah
National Register of Historic Places in Utah County, Utah
Commercial buildings completed in 1911
Buildings and structures in American Fork, Utah
Neoclassical architecture in Utah
1911 establishments in Utah